Beech Grove is an unincorporated community in Bullitt County, Kentucky, United States.

References

Unincorporated communities in Bullitt County, Kentucky
Unincorporated communities in Kentucky